Hopeless Romantics is a 2005 album by American vocalist Michael Feinstein accompanied by pianist George Shearing, recorded in 2002 and released on the Concord label. The album is a tribute to the American composer Harry Warren, who Feinstein met in his twenties.

Reception

The Allmusic review by Aaron Latham awarded the album 3½ stars and stated of Shearing that the "album's low-key approach leaves little room for him to shine", but praised Feinstein as "pitch-perfect" and that he "squeezes every ounce of good sentimentality out of each lyric".

Track listing

Personnel
Michael Feinstein - vocals
George Shearing - piano

References

Concord Records albums
Michael Feinstein albums
George Shearing albums
Tribute albums
2005 albums